Aditya Khanna (born 8 December 1971) is an Indian entrepreneur and investor. He has founded and invested in businesses in a diverse range of sectors. Khanna is a co-founder of FAARMS, an Indian agriculture technology startup. He has also had business interests in the hospitality, sports, financial services, consultancy and information technology sectors. Khanna is noted for his influential connections. He is a Non-Resident Indian (NRI) businessman based in London, England.

Early life 
Aditya Khanna was born on 8 December 1971 in Delhi, India. Khanna is the youngest son and youngest child of business magnate, Vipin Khanna and Naginder Khanna. His mother, Naginder was the daughter of Maharaja Bhupinder Singh of Patiala. Khanna's three elder siblings are Vinita, Navin and Arvind. 

Khanna attended school at Millfield in Somerset, England, where he was head boy. He attended university at Richmond, The American International University in London. Khanna has been a Non-Resident Indian based in London since 1983.

Career

Early career and family businesses 
Khanna started his career by joining his father, Vipin Khanna and his Dynamic Sales Service International (DSSI) group of companies. Khanna was the managing director of DSSI and was based in DSSI's London office. Khanna was also a director of DSSI Exports. In 1996, he was involved in DSSI's trading and marketing of agricultural commodities and fertilizers. In 1999, Khanna and Vipin were one of the bidders for Haryana Breweries Limited (HBL), during the company's privatisation by the Haryana Government and the HSIIDC.Khanna eventually became the vice chairman of DSSI Global, and led DSSI's international operations from the company's London office. During his time as vice chairman of DSSI, Khanna in 2017, led a high-level corporate delegation that met with Amarinder Singh, who was the Chief Minister of Punjab at the time and was visiting London. The delegation met with Singh to discuss Hera Group, an Italian utilities company, and their interest in starting an industrial waste conversion project, that would convert Punjab's industrial waste into energy and therefore help the state to lower pollution levels.
Khanna and Vipin also started businesses together. In 1995, he and Vipin founded Tamarind, a restaurant in London that became part of the Tamarind Collection, their restaurant group. Tamarind is an Indian restaurant in Mayfair and in 2001, became the first Indian restaurant in the United Kingdom to receive a Michelin star. Khanna and Vipin opened a second restaurant as well, named Imli. Imli was a restaurant in Soho, which was rebranded as Tamarind Kitchen in 2017. The Tamarind Collection acquired Zaika, an Indian restaurant in Kensington, in 2013. He was involved in the Tamarind Collection from its founding in 1995 to 2016.   

Khanna and Vipin also founded FiNoble Advisors, which was an investment bank. FiNoble Advisors had offices in New Delhi, London and New York City, and advised Indian companies that were searching for acquisitions in Europe and the United States. FiNoble also assisted foreign middle-market companies and financial institutions that were looking for opportunities in India.

Independent business career 
Khanna has founded businesses in various sectors, and is an investor as well. In 2001, Khanna co-founded Pipal Research, a knowledge process outsourcing (KPO) company, with headquarters in Chicago, and research centres in Bangalore, Noida and Gurugram. Pipal Research was one of India's most prominent KPO companies in the research and analytics segment. The company's clients included BT Global Services and Goldman Sachs. Pipal Research was also heavily involved in the financial services sector. Pipal Research had a contract with the London Stock Exchange to produce research for investors on companies listed on the Alternative Investment Market, which the company provided through their own web portal, Thomson Reuters and Bloomberg. Pipal Research also tested strategies and models for quantitative hedge funds, and also advised other hedge funds in their position sizing and market timing. The company was acquired by CRISIL in 2010.

Khanna has also founded companies and invested in ventures through his "Yog" group of companies. In 2010, his company, Yog Sports signed a ten year official merchandise distribution deal with the Indian Premier League and the eight original teams of the league. In 2016, Khanna's investment company, Yog Capital was a donor to Jo Johnson, who at the time was the Minister for Universities and Science under British Prime Minister, Theresa May. Jo Johnson is also the brother of Prime Minister Boris Johnson.

Khanna was one of the original co-owners of the Indian Premier League cricket team, Punjab Kings, which was founded in 2008. In 2011, he and businessman, Angad Paul financed restauranteur, Ilias Nathanail's pizza restaurants in London. In 2013, Khanna was part of a consortium of investors that acquired shares in Mangalore Chemicals and Fertilisers.

FAARMS 
In 2020, Khanna co-founded FAARMS. FAARMS is an Indian agricultural technology startup that provides an e-commerce platform for India's farming community. The company provides products and services to farmers across India through its online marketplace platform. FAARMS' platform also assists farmers in listing their produce in the company's centralised catalogue management system, through which farmers can sell to institutional buyers across India. In 2021, FAARMS delivered agricultural chemicals, equipment and commodities to 800,000 farmers and 20,000 villages across in India. In August 2021, the company raised $2 million in a seed round that was led Koh Boon Hwee and Dr. Cornelius Boersch, among other angel investors. 9Unicorns, one of India's most prominent startup accelerator platforms, also invested in FAARMS in 2021. In November 2021, the company signed a memorandum of understanding (MoU) with Central Warehousing Corporation (CWC), a Central Public Sector Enterprise (CPSE) under the Ministry of Consumer Affairs, Food and Public Distribution. The collaboration with CWC allows FAARMS to leverage CWC's network of warehouses for delivering farming needs to small and marginal famers. 

In January 2022, FAARMS entered into a business collaboration with Reliance General Insurance, and together, the two companies launched customised digital insurance products for India's rural population, with a particularly focus towards farmers. In April 2022, Bharat Bill Payment System started collaborating with FAARMS to enable recurring payments facility for farmers in India. In July 2022, FAARMS raised $10 million from investors in a funding round. The funding round was led by Cornelius Boersch, Koh Boon Hwee, Apoorva Ranjan Sharma, Ramit Bharti Mittal and other Indian and international investors. The $10 million funding round also included an investment from Auxano Capital, an early-stage venture capital firm.

Social work 
Khanna is on the advisory board of the UNAIDS Health Innovation Exchange. The Health Innovation Exchange was founded by the United Nations in 2019, and aims to bring leaders in the public and private sectors together, in order to promote innovations and investments in global health. He is also a volunteer for the Isha Foundation and has worked with Sadhguru. In 2011 Khanna through his company Yog Capital, was one of the partners of Leher Leher Kabir, a concert that was set up by the Yogi Arwind Foundation to support the Clean the Ganga project.

Controversies

Oil-for-Food scam 
Khanna was allegedly involved in the Oil-for-Food scam. The Oil-for-Food scam was a major scandal both in India and within the United Nations. In 2005, the Paul Volcker led Independent Enquiry Committee published its report on corruption within the Oil-for-Food Programme. One of the allegations in the report was that Natwar Singh, his family and the Indian National Congress were corrupt beneficiaries of illegal payments of the programme. Another allegation in the report was that Natwar Singh, his son Jagat Singh and Khanna, were connected with a company named Hamdan Exports, which acted as a middleman for illegal oil sales of to Masefield AG, which was a company Switzerland. Reportedly, in exchange for the sales, Masefield paid kickbacks, part of which allegedly went to Saddam Hussein's regime and the other parts allegedly went to Natwar Singh and others. Allegedly, the kickbacks were Hussein's method of obtaining support from politicians around the world, and that these benefits persuaded Natwar Singh to lobby against the US's Iraq policies, particularly the sanctions on Hussein. Khanna, who was also a relative of Natwar Singh, allegedly received financial payoffs from Masefield, by reportedly procuring oil contracts based on recommendations given by Natwar Singh. However, the Pathak Inquiry Authority found that there was no evidence linking the Congress Party with these dealings. In the aftermath of the report, Natwar Singh was sacked from the cabinet and suspended from the Congress Party, and Jagat Singh was expelled from the Congress. 

During the investigations, Khanna's passport was initially seized by the Central Bureau of Investigation (CBI). However, after further investigations, the Delhi High Court ordered the CBI to release Khanna's passport back to him. The Delhi High Court also stated that Khanna has not been implicated or arraigned as an accused person in the CBI's case. In addition to this, Khanna was cleared and given a clean chit by the Pathak Inquiry Authority. Furthermore, Khanna has also been cleared by the courts and the cases against him have been dismissed.

Securency 
Securency, the banknote company of the Reserve Bank of Australia, was being investigated for bribing foreign officials, in what was the largest foreign bribery investigation in Australian history. During the investigation, which began in 2007, Securency was accused of bribing foreign officials so that the company could win contracts for polymer note printing. The investigation revealed that in order to win the contracts, Securency would engage the help of politically connected businessmen. Khanna was one of the businessmen that Securency engaged with. Securency reportedly engaged with Khanna from 2000 to 2006.

Family 
Khanna comes from an influential family. He is the youngest son and youngest child of business magnate, Vipin Khanna and Naginder Khanna. His mother, Naginder was the daughter of Maharaja Bhupinder Singh of Patiala. Khanna has 3 elder siblings. His sister, Vinita Singh, is married to Randhir Singh, who is a sports administrator, a former member of the International Olympic Committee and a former Olympic-level shooter. His brother, Navin is a businessman. His brother, Arvind is a politician, business magnate and philanthropist. Khanna's first cousin is Amarinder Singh, former Chief Minister of Punjab, as Khanna's mother, Naginder, was Singh's paternal aunt and a sister of Maharaja Yadavindra Singh of Patiala.

References 

1971 births
Businesspeople from Delhi
Living people
Indian investors
Indian restaurateurs
Indian investment bankers
Indian technology company founders
Khanna family
Punjabi Hindus
People educated at Millfield
Indian Premier League franchise owners